Three Houses is a small village in Saint Philip Parish in Barbados.

External links

Populated places in Barbados